Hair-Trigger Casey is a 1936 American Western film directed by Harry L. Fraser.

Cast
 Jack Perrin as Capt. Jim "Hair-Trigger" Casey
 Starlight the Horse as Casey's Horse
 Betty Mack as Jane Elkins
 Ed Cassidy as Karney
 Fred "Snowflake" Toones as Snowflake
 Hal Taliaferro as Dave Casey
 Phil Dunham as Abner
 Robert Walker as Colton (Border Patrol)
 Dennis Moore as Lt. Brooks
 Victor Wong as Lee Fin - Karney's Enemy

References

External links
 
 
 

1936 films
1936 Western (genre) films
1930s crime films
American Western (genre) films
American action films
American black-and-white films
American crime films
Films with screenplays by Harry L. Fraser
1930s English-language films
1930s American films